Cocked & Loaded is the second studio album by American glam metal band L.A. Guns. Recorded at Hollywood studios One on One, Music Grinder and Conway Recording, it was produced by Duane Baron, John Purdell and Tom Werman, and released on August 22, 1989 by Vertigo Records. The album is the first to feature drummer Steve Riley. "Rip and Tear", "Never Enough", "The Ballad of Jayne", "I Wanna Be Your Man" and "Malaria" were released as the album's singles.

Following the success of their self-titled debut album the previous year, L.A. Guns quickly set about recording the follow-up in 1989. Writing for all tracks were credited to all five members of the band, while "Never Enough" was co-written by Gregg Tripp and Phil Roy. Four tracks were re-recorded by the reunited classic lineup of the band in 1999 for the compilation Greatest Hits and Black Beauties, and the whole album was re-recorded for the release Cocked & Re-Loaded.

Upon its release, Cocked & Loaded peaked at number 38 on the Billboard 200 and was certified gold by the Recording Industry Association of America in 1990. Both "Rip and Tear" and "The Ballad of Jayne" reached the top 50 of the Billboard Mainstream Rock chart, while the latter registered at number 33 on the Billboard Hot 100. Media response to the album was positive, with critics praising the band's development of their sound from their debut album the previous year.

Background
L.A. Guns recorded the follow-up to their 1988 self-titled debut album early the following year, working with producers Duane Baron, John Purdell and Tom Werman. Sessions took place at three Hollywood studios, One on One Studios, Music Grinder and Conway Recording. The album was the band's first to feature drummer Steve Riley, who took over from his predecessor Nickey "Beat" Alexander after the recording for L.A. Guns was completed. Five singles were released in promotion of the album, two of which charted in the US – "The Ballad of Jayne" reached number 33 on the Billboard Hot 100 and number 25 on the Mainstream Rock chart, while "Rip and Tear" reached number 47 on the latter chart. Music videos for all five tracks were featured on the 1990 video Love, Peace & Geese.

Reception

Upon its release, Cocked & Loaded debuted at number 89 on the US Billboard 200. It spent a total of 56 weeks on the chart, peaking at number 38 in July 1990. In the same month, the album was certified gold by the Recording Industry Association of America, for domestic sales in excess of 500,000 certified units. Outside of the US, the album reached number 23 on the Japanese Albums Chart, and number 38 on the UK Albums Chart.

Media response to Cocked & Loaded was generally positive. Cash Box magazine claimed that the band had "grown by leaps and bounds" since the release of their self-titled debut the previous year, praising the performance of lead guitarist Tracii Guns in particular. Billboard magazine's review was more mixed, as they described the album as "a spotty affair" and added that the band "has a sound that verges on the metal generic at times, but when the members click ... they can run with the best of the pack". The opinion of Los Angeles Times writer Janiss Garza was similar, who claimed that "The L.A.-based quintet's blatant disregard for subtlety works, as long as you don't think too deeply" and praised "Magdalaine" and "Give a Little" in particular as "a few interesting turns".

Retrospectively, the album has received widespread critical acclaim. Steve Huey of music website AllMusic dubbed it "L.A. Guns' most consistent and effective album", claiming that it "manages to balance the underlying darkness of Guns N' Roses' urban outlook with Mötley Crüe's party-anthem glam metal". In particular, Huey praised the songwriting as "among [the band's] best", highlighting the tracks "Never Enough" and "The Ballad of Jayne". Rolling Stone magazine named Cocked & Loaded the 27th best "hair metal" album of all-time, praising the variety of material on the release including "bullet-belt bravado" on "Rip and Tear", "17 Crash" and "Give a Little", the "hard-living knowledge" on display on "Sleazy Come Easy Go", and the "proggier side" shown on "Magdalaine" and "Malaria". In his review for The Collector's Guide to Heavy Metal, Martin Popoff described the music of the album as rock "with a Crüe-style inebriation here, yet with a strange, almost indiscernible cloak of mystery" and remarked the "intensity applied to the basic party metal format".

Track listing

Personnel

Charts

Certifications

References

External links

1989 albums
L.A. Guns albums
Vertigo Records albums
Mercury Records albums
Albums produced by Duane Baron
Albums produced by John Purdell
Albums produced by Tom Werman